Vikas Thakur (born 14 November 1993) is an Indian weightlifter from Hamirpur (Himachal Pradesh) who won silver in the men's 85 kg weight class at the 2014 Commonwealth Games at Glasgow, Scotland. He won a bronze in the 94 kg weight class at the 2018 Commonwealth Games in The Gold Coast. He won the silver medal in the men's 96kg event at the 2022 Commonwealth Games held in Birmingham, England.

References

External links

Living people
Indian male weightlifters
1989 births
Weightlifters at the 2014 Commonwealth Games
Weightlifters at the 2018 Commonwealth Games
Weightlifters at the 2022 Commonwealth Games
Weightlifters at the 2014 Asian Games
Commonwealth Games silver medallists for India
Commonwealth Games bronze medallists for India
Commonwealth Games medallists in weightlifting
Weightlifters at the 2018 Asian Games
Asian Games competitors for India
21st-century Indian people
Recipients of the Arjuna Award
Medallists at the 2014 Commonwealth Games
Medallists at the 2018 Commonwealth Games
Medallists at the 2022 Commonwealth Games